Ditch Creek is a stream in Washington and Jefferson counties, Missouri. It is a tributary of the Big River.

The creek most likely took its name from a nearby lead mine situated in a ditch.

See also
List of rivers of Missouri

References

Rivers of Jefferson County, Missouri
Rivers of Washington County, Missouri
Rivers of Missouri